John Alexander is a Scottish National Party (SNP) councillor and the current Leader of Dundee City Council.

John Alexander was first elected to the Strathmartine Ward (Ward 1) in the 2012 Scottish council election with 1245 1st preference votes, becoming Dundee's youngest ever serving councillor at 23 years old.

In the 2017 election, he was re-elected with an increase in 1st preference votes of 57%. Alexander subsequently became Leader of Dundee City Council after striking a deal to form an administration with veteran councillor, Ian Borthwick.

Education 
Alexander was educated at St Saviour's Roman Catholic High School in Dundee between 2000 and 2006. The school has since closed.

He attended the University of Dundee, initially studying Law (Scots) LL.B and latterly graduating with a Master of Arts in Politics & International Relations.

Career 
Following his election in 2012, Alexander held the role of Depute Convener of Housing within the majority SNP Council Administration. He was Depute to the then Convener of the Department, Councillor Jimmy Black.

Following Councillor Black's resignation from the post in 2013, Alexander assumed the role of Convener of the Housing Department, a post which he held until it was merged with the Environment Department in 2016.

In March 2016, Alexander became the first Convener of the newly created Neighbourhood Services Committee which was formed following the amalgamation of the Housing Department, Environment Department and Communities Section.

First term (2017-2022)

He held this post until his appointment as Leader of Dundee City Council in May 2017.

Alexander announced his intention to stand for re-election as leader of Dundee City Council and was confirmed as a candidate on 11 March 2022.

Second term (2022-present)

Alexander was subsequently re-elected in the Strathmartine ward, winning the most votes in the first preference and getting elected at the first stage. With the SNP winning a majority, Alexander secured a second term as leader of Dundee City Council after an election on 23 May 2022.

Awards & Acknowledgment 
Alexander won the 'SNP Councillor of the Year' category at the inaugural SNP Independence Magazine Awards 2018.

At The Herald Scottish Politician of the Year Awards 2018, Alexander won the 'Local Politician of the Year' category.

In November 2019, Alexander was named 'Leader of the Year' by Local Government Information Unit, an influential think tank, at its annual Councillor Awards.

At The Herald Scottish Politician of the Year Awards 2022, Alexander was nominated for the 'Local Politician of the Year' category.

References

Living people
Scottish politicians
Scottish National Party councillors
Leaders of local authorities of Scotland
1988 births
Alumni of the University of Dundee
Councillors in Dundee